USS Winnipec was a Mohongo-class gunboat built for the Union Navy during the final days of the American Civil War. There is no indication she was used in the war, but records indicate she was assigned to the United States Naval Academy at Annapolis, Maryland, for use as a schoolship. She was eventually sold in 1868.

Built in Massachusetts
Winnipec—a double-ended, iron-hulled, sidewheel gunboat—was built in 1864 at Boston, Massachusetts, by Harrison Loring. The ship was launched on 20 August 1864, but there is no record of her having been commissioned during the American Civil War or any portion of the year 1865.

Training ship for the Academy
Deck logs exist for Winnipec during the period 1 January to 6 October 1866, at which time she was assigned to the United States Naval Academy at Annapolis, Maryland, as a practice ship. Winnipec remained so assigned until late in 1867 when she moved to Norfolk, Virginia, for repairs.

Decommissioning
In 1868, Winnipec was placed in ordinary at Norfolk and remained in that status until she was sold to Mr. Thomas Clyde on 17 June 1869.

See also

Union Blockade

References

External links
Log of the U.S.S. Winnipec, 1865, MS 141 held by Special Collections & Archives, Nimitz Library at the United States Naval Academy

Ships of the Union Navy
Steamships of the United States Navy
Mohongo-class gunboats
Ships built in Boston
United States Naval Academy
1864 ships